Zazen shin, rendered in English as the Acupuncture Needle of Zazen, Lancet of Zazen, or Needle for Zazen, is a book of the Shōbōgenzō by the 13th century Sōtō Zen monk Eihei Dōgen. It was written on the 19th of April in 1242 at Dōgen's monastery Kōshōhōrin-ji in Kyoto. The book appears as the 12th book in the 75 fascicle version of the Shōbōgenzō, and it is ordered 27th in the later chronological 95 fascicle Honzan editions. The title Zazen shin refers to a poem of the same title written by Hongzhi Zhengjue. Hongzhi's poem is quoted verbatim in Dōgen's Zazen shin and also presented again in modified form later in the text.

References

Soto Zen
Zen texts